The SEZ Corridor  is an emerging corridor implementing a number of Special Economic Zones (SEZs) along the Grand Southern Trunk Road (NH 45) in Chennai. Started with the establishment of the Madras Export Processing Zone in 1984 (converted to a SEZ in 2003), the SEZ corridor currently has 5 operational SEZs and over 10 approved projects in development. The GST Road is widely made use of for SEZ projects due to its connectivity with various means of transport by road, rail and air. This is evident by the presence of the Chennai International Airport, various railway stations parallel to the road, and also its connectivity to the complex road network of the National Highways Authority of India.

SEZs
A number of SEZ projects has emerged in this stretch, making it the SEZ corridor of Chennai. It includes MEPZ SEZ established in 1984, Mahindra World City, New Chennai, Shriram Properties's Gateway SEZ, Estancia SEZ and ETL Infrastructure.

It is also emerging as a major IT SEZ region with a number of huge investments by Infosys. Infosys has set up its largest development center in Mahindra SEZ while India Land Tech Park is developing a massive  SEZ which is estimated to have  office space for both IT and Electronics use.

See also

Rajiv Gandhi Salai
Automotive Corridor
Electronics Corridor
Special Economic Zone
Free trade zone
List of SEZs in India

References

High-technology business districts in Chennai
Special Economic Zones of India